Peter Parker, a.k.a. Spider-Man, is a fictional character and eponymous protagonist of the Marvel's Spider-Man series of action-adventure games developed by Insomniac Games. Based on the Marvel Comics character of the same name created by Stan Lee and Steve Ditko, the character was adapted by Insomniac Games writers Jon Paquette, Benjamin Arfmann, and Kelsey Beachum, while he is voiced by Yuri Lowenthal. He has four signature suits: the Advanced Suit, the Velocity Suit designed by Adi Granov, the Resilient Suit designed by Gabriele Dell'Otto, and the Anti-Ock Suit designed by Dustin Brown.

Insomniac's Spider-Man is depicted as an older, more mature and experienced version of the character, who has battled various supervillains in his eight-year career as the city's protector while still struggling to balance his superhero alter-ego with his life as Peter Parker. He later becomes the mentor of Miles Morales after the latter receives similar spider-like abilities after being bitten by a different spider from Oscorp. 

This incarnation of the character has thus far appeared as the main playable protagonist in Marvel's Spider-Man (2018), while being featured in a supporting capacity in the spin-off title Marvel's Spider-Man: Miles Morales (2020), and will return as a playable character and one of the two protagonists, alongside Miles Morales in Marvel's Spider-Man 2 (2023). The character was later established in Marvel Comics continuity as an alternate version of Spider-Man within the comics' multiverse, being expanded upon by two comic book adaptations, two novels and a spinoff comic book series, designating the universe his stories take place in as "Earth-1048", with the character later cameoing in the 2023 feature film Spider-Man: Across the Spider-Verse, depicted as a member of Miguel O'Hara's Spider-Forces. Insomniac's more mature take on the character was well received. Marketing and merchandising of the character mostly wearing the advanced suit was released before and after the original games' initial release.

Actor John Bubniak's likeness was used for Peter Parker in Marvel's Spider-Man on PlayStation 4. He was subsequently replaced by Ben Jordan for Marvel's Spider-Man: Miles Morales and the original game's remaster on PlayStation 5 and Microsoft Windows, to better match the facial CGI capture of Yuri Lowenthal. This change has garnered mixed reactions.

Development

Creation

Several characters from Marvel Comics were considered to have their own game developed by Insomniac Games but the team's final choice was to adapt Spider-Man. This was due to him and his true identity Peter Parker being more relatable to the staff than other Marvel characters such as Thor and Iron Man, a sentiment that Insomniac CEO Ted Price shared. Spider-Man was the first licensed property by Insomniac in 22 years.

Creative director Bryan Intihar collaborated with a team of writers under lead writer Jon Paquette to create an original take on a Spider-Man that remained true to the original. Paquette is cited to have commonly subscribed to Spider-Man (The Amazing Spider-Man and Peter Parker: The Spectacular Spider-Man) and also Thor comic books at the "boonies" at a younger age before his time attending film school. Alongside Paquette, the story was written by Ben Arfman and Kelsey Beachum. Comic book and screenwriter Christos Gage co-wrote the script, and comic book writer Dan Slott provided additional story contributions. Insomniac researched different iterations of the character to understand what made a compelling Spider-Man story, after which Paquette said "okay let's forget all that stuff", aiming to not draw too much from any single version. One lesson the team took from the research was that whenever Spider-Man wins, Peter Parker loses, and vice versa. Intihar said that from conception, the game was designed to be as much Parker's story as Spider-Man's. The team deliberately avoided retelling Spider-Man's origin, reasoning that everyone knows Spider-Man was bitten by a radioactive spider.

Yuri Lowenthal provides the voice of Peter Parker a.k.a. Spider-Man, but there was some initial reluctance to cast him as he had previously voiced a characteristically different lead character in Sunset Overdrive and it was thought that he was not capable of providing a drastically different performance. Paquette trusted his acting ability however, and convinced the studio to cast him. Working with voice director Kris Zimmerman, Lowenthal tried to differentiate his voices for Parker in his civilian life where he is more gentle, and as Spider-Man, where he is more confident. As a result, he spent a large amount of time working on his performance to achieve a balance. Lowenthal worked with two stunt people throughout the game's development.

Design 

Whilst beginning the game in a costume based on the classic Steve Ditko design, its subsequent damage results in Peter Parker making a new costume with input from Otto Octavius. It is referred to in-game as the Advanced suit. 

Insomniac wanted to modernize the design of Spider-Man's costume while paying homage to the original design by Ditko. The new advanced costume design retains the traditional red-and-blue color scheme, a large white spider symbol stretching across the torso, gauntlet-like gloves, and sneaker-style design based on athletic wear instead of knee-high boots. Art director Jacinda Chew said the design goal was to create what a "23-year-old, would-be superhero" would wear in 2018 New York City. Chew compared the outfit to compression wear, and said each color represented different materials. Blue is the most flexible, red is thicker for added protection from minor injury, and white offers the most protection, as it covers his chest, hands, and feet.

The Velocity Suit is another original suit and was designed by comic book artist Adi Granov. The suit is depicted with a glowing red-and-grey design and features metallic paneling.

Appearances and summary

Tie-in prequel novel
An official prequel tie-in novel titled Marvel's Spider-Man: Hostile Takeover was released on August 21, 2018, predating the video game. It details Spider-Man's fight with the book's version of Blood Spider and depicts the rivalry between Parker and the Kingpin before the events of the game.

Marvel's Spider-Man video game series
The character was developed primarily for the 2018 video game Marvel's Spider-Man, and later appeared in its downloadable content (DLC) expansion pack, Marvel's Spider-Man: The City That Never Sleeps, both for the PlayStation 4. 

Peter Parker was a bright, intelligent and sincere, yet shy, outcast and withdrawn 15-year-old high school student, who gained spider-like superhuman abilities after being bitten by a genetically modified spider during a field trip. Employing a secret identity, Parker initially attempts to uses these abilities for personal gain and fails to aprehend a robber, who later kills his uncle, Ben Parker. Following Ben's murder, Parker decides to use his abilities to protect the citizens of New York City as the superhero Spider-Man. Eight years into his superhero career, the now 23-year-old Parker has become an experienced and masterful crime-fighter who comes into conflict with various supervillains, but struggles to balance both his personal and superhero lives. He is employed as a research lab assistant under his friend and mentor Dr. Otto Octavius and is aided in his fight by intrepid Daily Bugle reporter Mary Jane Watson, his former high school classmate and ex-girlfriend, and NYPD Captain Yuri Watanabe. In his civilian life, Parker is supported by his Aunt May. Spider-Man's adventure brings him into contact with other characters, including Afro-Puerto-Rican-American teenager Miles Morales and his parents, NYPD Officer Jefferson Davis and Rio Morales; Oscorp CEO and New York mayor Norman Osborn; and Silver Sablinova, leader of the private military company Sable International.

Parker makes a minor appearance in the follow-up/spin-off title Marvel's Spider-Man: Miles Morales, wherein he helps his protégé Miles Morales subdue the Rhino at the beginning of the game before departing for Symkaria to join Mary Jane in covering the civil war taking place there as a freelance photographer for the Daily Bugle and entrusts Miles to look after the city, gifting him a new red and blue suit similar to Peter's own original suit, which Miles eventually shifts from after designing a new black and red suit with his best friend Ganke Lee. Throughout the game, Peter is revealed to have set up AI training challenges throughout the city, which Miles can undertake to earn skill points which he can use to uprgade his abilities. He returns at the end of the game where he praises Miles' growth as a hero after the latter stops the war between the Underground and Roxxon, compliments his new suit and heads off to fight crime alongside him. Later in-game dialogue with Miles reveals that he is taking a hiatus from crime-fighting to focus on renovating Aunt May's old house in Queens, which he inherited and where he and Mary Jane have decided to move in together, while also focusing on finding a new job with Miles suggesting he take up a teaching job.

The character will be back in Marvel's Spider-Man 2, releasing in 2023 for the PlayStation 5. He will feature as a main playable protagonist alongside Miles.

Marvel Comics canon continuity

The character appears in the 2018 Spider-Geddon comic book storyline written by Christos Gage, a sequel to 2014's Spider-Verse, which brings together different variations of Spider-Man themed superheroes from the multiverse within Marvel Comics to battle the Inheritors. It was first released on September 26, 2018. The comic book designated the character's universe as Earth-1048. The story of Spider-Geddon takes place after the events of the game, and also introduces the universe's version of Tarantula. Insomniac artists provided variant comic book covers for the series. Gage felt that "it seemed like a perfect time" to bring the character into mainstream comic books.

A six-issue comic book, titled Marvel's Spider-Man: City at War, was released in March 2019. It follows the events of the game while introducing some new events. The series is published by Marvel, written by Dennis Hopeless, with art by Michelle Bandini, and variant cover arts by Clayton Crain, David Nakayama, Gerardo Sandoval and Adi Granov. A second miniseries, Marvel's Spider-Man: Velocity, was released in August 2019. Also written by Hopeless, with art by Emilio Laiso, the miniseries takes place after the events of the game, detailing Spider-Man's encounter with the supervillain Swarm, and Mary Jane's work with reporter Ben Urich. A third miniseries, Marvel's Spider-Man: The Black Cat Strikes, was released in 2020. Written by Hopeless with art by Luca Maresca, the miniseries adapts the events of the downloadable content The City That Never Sleeps while elaborating upon Spider-Man and Black Cat's relationship.

Animated Spider-Verse films 
Alongside the release of its second trailer in December 2022, a Spider-Man reflecting the Insomniac Games' version of Peter Parker's Advanced Suit, and another Spider-Man wearing the Velocity Suit would appear in the upcoming film Spider-Man: Across the Spider-Verse (2023), after the character's Advanced Suit was prominently featured in various background cameos throughout the preceding film, Spider-Man: Into the Spider-Verse (2018). In the film, these Spider-Men will be featured as a member of the Spider-Forces alongside other alternate Spider-People, led by Miguel O' Hara / Spider-Man 2099 (Oscar Isaac).

Merchandising and marketing

Artwork dedicated by famed comic book artist, Alex Ross, depicting the character was featured by Game Informer even before the game release. 
The character was also spotlighted in a blockbuster style commercial in a 2018 NFL Draft Thursday night premiere of American football by NBC.

Around the release of the game, PlayStation 4 Pro bundles included official skins of the character's logo entitled "Amazing Red".

Various merchandise of the character was sold before the game's release. Action Figures were made by companies like Diamond Select Toys releasing a  statue of Spider-Man along with Sideshow Collectibles releasing two 1/6 scale statues both based on the game, one of Spider-Man in the stealth suit and another of his Spider-Punk costume, including a guitar and spider-drone. A velocity suit-wearing Spider-Man by Hot Toys was also announced by Sideshow Collectibles. Hasbro released a Marvel Legends action figure of Spider-Man from the video game as a GameStop exclusive. A Funko Pop figure of the character was released, which was also exclusive to GameStop. Clothes such as hoodies and t-shirts of the character and the advanced costume have been made.

Reception

Portrayal reaction
Insomniac Games' portrayal of Peter Parker has been well received. Jonahan Dornbush of IGN praised the game's focus on Parker and highlighted Yuri Lowenthal for his "emotional honesty" that made it one of Dornbush's favorite portrayals of the character. Dom Nero of Esquire praised the character as one of the best versions of Spider-Man he has seen. He enjoyed the way that Insomniac depicted Spider-Man's morality while still allowing him to "web-kick some ass". He also praised the way that it handled the transition into adulthood. Noel Ransome of Vice found him identifiable for his difficulty in achieving "greatness", praising Insomniac for taking the risk of depicting a more mature Peter as well as the misfortune of the original Spider-Man.

Josh Harmon of Electronic Gaming Monthly found the character's storytelling to be one of the most interesting things about the game. He praised the writers for their understanding of Spider-Man and heroes in general, which he felt was handled better than how other comic adaptations handle their protagonists. Matt Goldberg of Collider felt that Insomniac did well with understanding Spider-Man's "ethos" and challenging it in unique ways.

The character was named the fan-favorite video game character at the Gamers' Choice Awards in 2018. Comic Book Resources regarded the advanced costume as one of Spider-Man's best alternate costumes.

Face model change controversy
Following the announcement of Marvel's Spider-Man being remastered as a launch title on the PlayStation 5, Insomniac Games revealed that a new face model provided by Ben Jordan would be implemented into the game, to be a better match to the facial capture recorded by Yuri Lowenthal. The new face model reveal was met with major polarizing reactions from fans and critics, and developers received death threats and demands to change it back. Many have cited that the new face model looks drastically younger than the original face model provided by John Bubniak, and has been compared to actor Tom Holland who portrays Peter Parker / Spider-Man in the Marvel Cinematic Universe. On a more positive note, Sammy Barker of Push Square called the design "pretty good" in his rundown announcement of the new design update.

In other media 
 In the 2018 animated film Spider-Man: Into the Spider-Verse, the Advanced Suit makes multiple background appearances throughout the film and is featured more prominently during the end credits sequence.
 A deleted scene featured in the trailer for the Sony's Spider-Man Universe (SSU) film Morbius (2022) depicts Insomniac's Spider-Man wearing a rendition of the Sam Raimi film series suit, featured in the background as graffiti art.
 The live-action Marvel Cinematic Universe (MCU) film Spider-Man: No Way Home (2021) features multiple homages to Insomniac's incarnation of the character, with actor Tom Holland. who portrays that franchise's iteration of Peter Parker, recalling playing the first game in his free time during principal photography. During the fight with the displaced Norman Osborn / Green Goblin (Willem Dafoe) at Happy Hogan's conduminium, Peter performs an attack on Osborn that mirrors one of the specialized takedown techniques that can be executed on common enemies in the game and was used by Spider-Man on Kingpin at the end of their fight in the beginning of the game. Said encounter also results in the demise of Peter's aunt May Parker (Marisa Tomei), which mirrors the game and multiple comics featuring the character. During the sequence at the end of the film where Peter is mourning May at her grave following the restoration of his secret identity courtesy of Doctor Strange (Benedict Cumberbatch), a shot of her tombstone reveals her epitaph as reading. "When you help someone, you help everyone", which directly references her personal mantra recited by Martin Li to Peter at the F.E.A.S.T. shelter, during the main story campaign in Marvel's Spider-Man where incidentally the MCU version of May Parker also works and possibly runs as Martin Li is not yet depicted in the MCU.
 Insomniac's Spider-Man was referenced in Astro's Playroom (2020), a pack-in game for the PlayStation 5 released at the console's launch, which featured numerous allusions to various franchises published on or exclusive to PlayStation consoles. When entering the Caching Caves area, turning south-east of the Shock Walls leads to a room with an Astro Bot hanging upside-down from a web on the ceiling, a pose commonly associated with the character.
 2 Spider-Men reflecting original suits from Insomniac's Spider-Man will appear in the 2023 animated feature film Spider-Man: Across the Spider-Verse, depicted as a member of Miguel O'Hara's Spider-Forces, along with his reality's Miles Morales.

See also 
Spider-Man in video games
Alternative versions of Spider-Man

References

Further reading

External links
 
 
 Peter Parker at Marvel's Spider-Man Wiki

Action video game characters
Alternative versions of Spider-Man
Fictional American people in video games
Fictional characters from Queens, New York
Fictional homeless people
Fictional inventors in video games
Fictional photographers
Fictional scientists in video games
Fictional war correspondents
Hackers in video games
Male characters in video games
Marvel Comics American superheroes
Marvel Comics characters who can move at superhuman speeds
Marvel Comics characters with accelerated healing
Marvel Comics characters with superhuman strength
Marvel Comics mutates
Marvel Comics orphans
Marvel Comics scientists
Marvel Comics superheroes
Marvel's Spider-Man
Orphan characters in video games
Sony Interactive Entertainment protagonists
Video game characters introduced in 2018
Video game characters who can move at superhuman speeds
Video game characters with accelerated healing
Video game characters with superhuman strength
Video game protagonists
Video game superheroes
Vigilante characters in video games